The Sarajevo Process was a 1983 trial against 13 Muslim intellectuals accused of Islamic fundamentalism. Arrests were made in April 1983, trials held in August 1983. The accused were members of the Young Muslims. Among these were Alija Izetbegović, the author of the essay Islamic Declaration (1970) and later leader of the Party of Democratic Action (SDA) active during the breakup of Yugoslavia, and the first President of Bosnia and Herzegovina. All were sentenced to prison, and were pardoned in 1988.

Omer Behmen, 15 years
Salih Behmen, 5 years
Đula Bičakčić
, 7 years
Hasan Čengić, 10 years
Derviš Đurđević
Alija Izetbegović, 14 years
Džemaludin Latić, 6.5 years
Ismet Kasumagić, 10 years
Melika Salihbegović
Mustafa Spahić, 5 years
Husein Živalj, 6 years

References

Further reading

Islam in Yugoslavia
1983 in Yugoslavia
Political repression in Communist Yugoslavia
Yugoslav Bosnia and Herzegovina
1980s in Bosnia and Herzegovina
Islamism in Europe
Trials of political people
Trials in Yugoslavia
20th century in Sarajevo